The 1982 Smithwicks Irish Professional Championship was a professional invitational snooker tournament, which took place between 9 and 13 March 1982. The tournament was played at the Riverside Theatre in Coleraine, Northern Ireland, and featured eight professional players. After many years as a challenge match, this was the first time the championship was held as a knockout event.

Dennis Taylor won the title beating Alex Higgins 16–13 in the final.

Main draw

References

Irish Professional Championship
Irish Professional Championship
Irish Professional Championship
Irish Professional Championship